EFPA may refer to:

Equivalent Flat Plate Area [m2] - used in aircraft drag force calculations
Erlang fixed point approximation formula devised in 1917 by Agner Krarup Erlang
European Federation of Psychologists' Associations
European Financial Planning Association